Oxford Falls Grammar School (OFG) is an independent Christian co-educational primary and secondary school, located in Oxford Falls on the Northern Beaches of Sydney, New South Wales, Australia.

The school is a member of Christian Schools Australia, the Christian Schools Sporting Association (CSSA) and is a member of  the Combined Independent Schools (CIS).

The current Principal of Oxford Falls Grammar School is Peter Downey, who took up his post in 2017.

Headmasters 
The following individuals have served as Headmasters of the Oxford Falls Grammar:

Facilities 

Oxford Falls Grammar is set in a semi-rural suburb of Oxford Falls in Sydney's Northern Beaches. Facilities include two full-sized ovals, a small oval, an indoor gymnasium/basketball court, an outdoor basketball court, an indoor gym, a large auditorium, a large multi-purpose space, a state of the art theatre with retractable seating, and a Performing Arts Centre incorporating purpose-built Dance and Drama studios, music tuition rooms, a production studio, an acoustic music room, an electronic music studio, and a dedicated concert and stage band rehearsal room, a canteen and a café.

Sport 

Oxford Falls Grammar competes in many sports, including at state and national levels.

Sports teams at Oxford Falls Grammar include athletics, Australian rules football, basketball, cheerleading, cross country, diving, netball, rugby league, rugby sevens, rugby union, soccer, swimming, tennis, touch football, triathlon, and Ultimate frisbee.

Basketball is one of the main sports played in both the Junior and Senior schools. Teams have gone on to reach national levels, and have competed at events such as The National Christian Schools Basketball Championships. The school is well represented at local and state Rugby, Soccer and Netball gala days. Aussie rules is a popular sport in the Junior school and Oxford Falls Grammar is very successful in competitions; reaching the 2006 NSW Finals in the Paul Kelly Cup. The school competes in swimming, diving, athletics and cross country events at Metropolitan, CSSA State and CIS State levels. Swimmers have gone on past CSSA State level to the annual National Christian Schools Swimming Championships. In 2005, a number of students competed in the Pacific School Games and brought home a number of Gold medals.

PISA sport is also offered and includes T-ball, senior girls softball, senior boys cricket, boys and girls soccer, girls netball, boys rugby league (mod-league) and mixed AFL.

The School is a member of Combined Independent Schools (CIS) which allows a highly competitive pathway for individuals in a large array of sports.

Performing arts 

Oxford Falls Grammar is highly regarded in NSW as a leading Independent School in the area of Performing Arts. The number of students involved in the extra-curricular Performing Arts Program represents two-thirds of students in the School.

Opportunities for students include K-2 Keyboard club, Training Band, Junior Concert Band, Junior Choir, Junior Guitar Ensemble, Junior Woodwind Ensemble, Junior Stage Band, Intermediate Bass Ensemble, Debut Bass Ensemble, Junior Bass Ensemble, Acoustic Guitar Ensemble, Senior Bass Ensemble, Senior Concert Band, Senior Wind Ensemble, OFG Marching Band, Percussion Ensemble, Pop & Rock Band, Senior School Choir, Show Choir, Senior Stage Band, Senior Jazz Band, Extra curricular Drama (Junior & Senior School), extra-curricular dance (Junior & Senior School), audition-entry dance eisteddfod team, theatresports classes, and Glee Club.

OFG has one of the largest music tuition studios in Sydney, with over 600 students weekly receiving private music tuition during school hours.

Students sit the international Trinity College London music exams on traditional instruments, and Rockschool International exams on contemporary Rock and Pop instruments including vocals. Examiners are flown out from the UK in Term 4 to assess the students on their individual exams.

Academic 
Students can also participate in extra-curricular Latin, Maths Challenge, Maths Olympiad, Chess Club, Informatics Competition and Olympiad, The da Vinci Decathlon, The Great Engineering Challenge, Science Olympiads, Tournament of Minds, Writing Competitions, and the Model United Nations Debating and Public Speaking Programs and the Debating Team.

Notable alumni 

 Charlotte Bestactress
 Chloe Dalton rugby union player; 2016 Olympic gold medallist
 Anneliese Rubiesprinter; 2016 Rio Olympian
 Remy Siemsensoccer player

See also 

 List of non-government schools in New South Wales

References 

Private primary schools in Sydney
Private secondary schools in Sydney
Educational institutions established in 1984
Nondenominational Christian schools in Sydney
Junior School Heads Association of Australia Member Schools
1984 establishments in Australia
Private schools Northern Beaches Sydney